La Femme is a French psych-punk rock band established by guitarist Sacha Got and keyboard player Marlon Magnée in 2010 in Biarritz. Several members joined later, including bass player Sam Lefevre, drummer Noé Delmas, and Lucas Nunez. Other members include Clara Luciani, Jane Peynot and Marilou Chollet.

The band's music has been described as synthetic and hypnotic. It mixes elements of cold wave, punk, and yéyé, with musical influence from artists such as Sparks, The Velvet Underground, and Kraftwerk.

La Femme released three EPs from 2010 to 2013, titled La Femme EP, La Podium #1, and La Femme. Their debut full-length, Psycho Tropical Berlin, was released on April 8, 2013. La Femme earned the French award Victoires de la Musique in the category "Album revelation" in February 2014. On April 2, 2021 the group released their highly anticipated third album, Paradigmes, featuring several previously released tracks.

Discography

Albums

EPs

Singles

Others
2011: "From Tchernobyl with Love"
2012: "La Planche"
2012: "Télégraphe”
2017: “Orgie de gobelins sous champignons”
2019: “L'hawaïenne”

References

External links
Facebook

Musical groups from Nouvelle-Aquitaine
French rock music groups
French psychedelic rock music groups
French post-punk music groups
Musical groups established in 2010
Biarritz
Barclay Records artists
2010 establishments in France